Applied Physics Letters is a weekly peer-reviewed scientific journal that is published by the American Institute of Physics. Its focus is rapid publication and dissemination of new experimental and theoretical papers regarding applications of physics in all disciplines of science, engineering, and modern technology. Additionally, there is an emphasis on fundamental and new developments which lay the groundwork for fields that are rapidly evolving.

The journal was established in 1962. The editor-in-chief is Lesley F. Cohen (Imperial College London).

Abstracting and indexing
This journal is indexed in the following databases:
Chemical Abstracts Service
Current Contents/Physical, Chemical & Earth Sciences
Science Citation Index Expanded

According to the Journal Citation Reports, the journal has a 2021 impact factor of 3.971.

References

External links 
 

Physics journals
Publications established in 1962
Weekly journals
English-language journals
American Institute of Physics academic journals